EDSA Revolution of 2001 refers to either of two consecutive events relating to a change of power in the Philippines over the course of the first four months of 2001.

These are:
EDSA II in January 2001 that toppled President Joseph Estrada after an aborted impeachment trial
EDSA III in April 2001 that climaxed in a failed siege of the presidential palace by Estrada's supporters

See also
 EDSA (disambiguation)